Taboo: The Sixth Sense is a tarot card reading simulation developed by Rare and published by Tradewest for the Nintendo Entertainment System (NES) in 1989.

This video game gives users a tarot reading where the "dealer" automatically shuffles the cards. It is the only NES game to carry two warnings: that it is intended for players ages fourteen and older and the game is intended for entertainment purposes only. Taboo was marketed as a party game that multiple adults could enjoy simultaneously.

Gameplay
Upon loading, the game requires input of the player's name, birth date, and gender. The game then asks the user to input a question, and shuffles the cards. The game then generates a tarot reading via the Celtic cross layout. These cards can be normal or reversed.  Afterward, the player chooses a state from the United States and is given lottery numbers accordingly. The game uses the whole 78-card tarot deck, which consists of the Minor Arcana and Major Arcana.

The instruction booklet gives a brief history of the origins of the word "Tarot". The booklet also lists the arcana and cards, and goes into further detail of the layout, including what each position on the Celtic cross means. There is no actual game activity to be found apart from repeated readings. The game contains nudity and religious images, which were usually unacceptable under Nintendo of America's content guidelines.

Urban legend 
An urban legend surrounding Taboo states that the game had accurately predicted the deaths of some of its young players.

See also 
 House of Tarot  1991 Sega video game
 Tarot Mystery 1995 Super Famicom video game

References

External links

Putting Taboo To The Test - Will The Writer Win The Lottery With Taboo's Suggested Numbers?

1989 video games
Nintendo Entertainment System games
Nintendo Entertainment System-only games
North America-exclusive video games
Tarotology
Tradewest games
Divination software and games
Video games scored by David Wise
Video games developed in the United Kingdom
Single-player video games